The 2022 League1 Ontario season is the seventh season of play for Women's Division of League1 Ontario, a Division 3 women's soccer league in the Canadian soccer league system and the highest level of soccer based in the Canadian province of Ontario.

NDC Ontario defeated Alliance United FC in the final to win the league championship. As NDC Ontario was unavailable to participate in the League1 Canada Interprovincial Championship due to scheduling issues, Alliance United instead represented the league, finishing in third place.

Format and changes
After the 2021 season format was adjusted into a shorter-season form with some teams opting out due to the COVID-19 pandemic, the league will return to a single table format with all clubs for the 2022 season. With the league set to split into a multi-division format with promotion-relegation beginning in 2024, the points obtained in this season will contribute to the original placement of clubs in 2024, with the points from the 2022 season (weighted at 75%) being added to the points teams obtain in the 2023 season (weighted at 100%) to determine the placements.

The top-six teams in the regular season qualified for the playoffs with the top-two teams receiving first round byes. The semi-finals were played on July 30 and 31 with the final on August 6. NDC Ontario won the championship and qualified for the Women's Interprovincial Championship in Laval, Quebec.

Clubs
The women's division has grown to 20 teams through expansion. Burlington SC, Electric City FC, Simcoe County Rovers, St. Catharines Roma Wolves, and the Canada Soccer National Development Centre Ontario join the league as expansion teams, ProStars FC returns as a new club as well having previously competed for one season in 2015. Guelph Union and Waterloo United will make their official Premier Division debuts, after having opted out of the main division last season, having fielded teams in either the short-season Summer Championship or Reserve divisions instead.

The following clubs are set to participate in the league.

Premier Division

Playoffs

Quarter-finals

Semi-finals

Final

Statistics 
Statistics include regular season matches only, not playoff matches.

Top goalscorers 

Source:

Top goalkeepers 

 Minimum 900 minutes played.  Source:

Awards

League All-Stars 
The following players were named League1 Ontario All-Stars for the 2022 season:

First Team All-Star

Second Team All-Star

Third Team All-Star

The following players were named League1 Ontario Premier Division U18 All-Stars for the 2022 season:

U18 All-Star Team

Summer Reserve Division
The Reserve Division will return with each Premier Division club fielding one or more teams, as well as some other non-Premier League OPDL clubs.

North East Division

West Division

Central Division

Playoffs

Fall Reserve Division

Playoffs

References

External links 

League1 Ontario
League1 Ontario (women) seasons
Ontario W